The Walking Dead: Songs of Survival Vol. 2 is a soundtrack for the fourth season of The Walking Dead. It was released on August 26, 2014 by Republic Records. It was included as a Walmart Exclusive on the Blu-ray release of The Walking Dead: The Complete Fourth Season. The CD was also included in the limited edition The Walking Dead: The Complete Fourth Season DVD release with the West Georgia Correctional Facility prison key.

Track listing

 Meshell Ndegeocello – "Good Day Bad"
 The Lumineers – "Visions of China"
 Phantogram – "Never Going Home (Alt-J. Remix)"
 Crooked Fingers – "All the Young Thugs"
 Colbie Caillat – "The Way I Was"
 Kongos – "Escape (Acoustic)"
 Godsmack – "Turning to Stone (Acoustic)"
 Alela Diane – "The Light"

Television soundtracks
The Walking Dead music
2014 compilation albums
2014 soundtrack albums
Republic Records soundtracks